Earth Sciences Week is a yearly event run by the American Geosciences Institute (AGI) to promote understanding of Earth science and stewardship of the planet. It is typically held in the second full week of October. 

The events are partially funded and sponsored by the USGS, the National Park Service, and the NASA, as well as additional geoscience-oriented agencies, nonprofit organizations, and private corporations.

Earth Science Week objectives 
 To engage students in discovering the Earth sciences.
 To remind people that Earth science is all around us.
 To encourage Earth stewardship through understanding.
 To motivate geoscientists to share their knowledge and enthusiasm about the Earth.

Events 
The Earth Science Week website maintains a listing of groups in the Earth Science Week network, as well as a state-by-state listing of Earth Science Week events. These events are sponsored by AGI member societies, state geological surveys, colleges and universities, public and private schools, museums,  parks, and other organizations and businesses with interests in Earth science.

Toolkits 
Earth Science Week Toolkits feature AGI’s traditional event poster and school-year calendar showcasing geoscience careers, classroom investigations, and important dates of Earth science events. Also typically included are posters, flyers, electronic disks, bookmarks, and activities from AGI and its member societies and sponsors. Toolkits are distributed to state geological surveys, aGI member societies, and others. Toolkits may be ordered through the program website.

National contests 
AGI holds national contests in connection with Earth Science Week. The photo contests are designed to encourage K-12 students, teachers, and the general public to get involved in the celebration by exploring artistic and academic applications of Earth science. 

There are four mediums in which contests are held: Photography, Video, Visual Arts, and Essay. Each contest explores a new theme every year.

Official proclamations 
AGI works with state geological surveys to secure gubernatorial proclamations to be made for each year's Earth Science Week. 

Seven states have issued perpetual proclamations: Alaska, Delaware, Illinois, Nevada, North Dakota, Oklahoma, and South Dakota.

Presidential recognition 
AGI has obtained Presidential proclamations for Earth Science Week in past years from Presidents Bill Clinton and George W. Bush.

Themes 
2001: Change Through Time: Earth History
2002: Water Is All Around Us
2003: Eyes on Planet Earth: Monitoring Our Changing World
2004: Living on a Restless Earth: Natural Hazards and Mitigation
2005: Geoscientists Explore the Earth
2006: Be a Citizen Scientist!
2007: The Pulse of Earth Science
2008: No Child Left Inside
2009: Understanding Climate
2010: Exploring Energy
2011: Our Ever-Changing Earth
2012: Exploring Careers in the Earth Sciences
2013: Mapping Our World
2014: Earth's Connected Systems
2015: Visualizing Earth Systems
2016: Our Shared Geoheritage
2017: Earth and Human Activity
2018: Earth as Inspiration
2019: Geoscience Is for Everyone
2020: Earth Materials in Our Lives
2021: Water Today and for the Future

See also 

American Geosciences Institute
List of geoscience organizations
National Fossil Day

References

External links 
Official Website
Earth Science World (A geosciences gateway from the American Geosciences Institute)
American Geosciences Institute (Main website for the American Geosciences Institute)

Earth sciences
Science festivals
Awareness weeks in the United States
Recurring events established in 1998
October observances